Merzifon Airport or Amasya Merzifon Airport  is a military airport located in the city of Merzifon in the Amasya Province of Turkey.

Airlines and destinations

Statistics

Military usage
Merzifon is the 5th Air Wing (Ana Jet Üs or AJÜ) of the 2nd Air Force Command (Hava Kuvvet Komutanligi) of the Turkish Air Force (Türk Hava Kuvvetleri). Other wings of this command are located in Malatya/Erhaç (LTAT), Diyarbakır (LTCC) and İncirlik (LTAG).

References

External links
 
 

Airports in Turkey
Turkish Air Force bases
Buildings and structures in Amasya Province
Transport in Amasya Province
Merzifon District